José Manuel Ortúzar Formas (1796–1848) was a Chilean lawyer and politician. He was born in Santiago in 1796. He died in the same city, in March 1848. He was the son of José Manuel Ortúzar e Ibanez de Ovalle and Maria del Carmen Formas Patiño. He married Dolores Ramírez y Fernández Garzón.

Education and career
Ortúzar was educated at the National Institute and obtained his law degree in 1819. After the abdication of Bernardo O'Higgins, he joined with General Ramón Freire's pipiolas forces and went to the campaigns in Chiloé alongside the Chilean military. On his return he was honorably discharged from the army and went to the civilian world, working as a lawyer. During the Civil War of 1830, he was not with the pipiolo side. Subsequently, he joined the Liberal Party, for which he was elected Senator for the province of Coquimbo (1831-1840), of Ñuble (1840-1843) and Santiago (1843-1849). In these periods he joined the Standing Committee on Government and Foreign Affairs.

References

1796 births
1848 deaths
Chilean people of Basque descent
Members of the Senate of Chile
19th-century Chilean lawyers